Area 17 can refer to:

 Area 17 (Nevada Test Site)
 Visual cortex, Brodmann area 17